The Ae 6/6 is a heavy electric locomotive used by the Swiss Federal Railways (SBB-CFF-FFS). It is sometimes also referred to as canton locomotive ("Kantonslokomotive"), because the first 25 locomotives were named after the cantons, and carried the canton's coat of arms on the side and chrome embellishments (a single raised stripe on each side and three raised stripes on each end), and the Swiss coat of arms on the front, between the chrome stripes. These adornments made them internationally famous. The other 95 locomotives received the names of capital cities of Swiss cantons, and other towns and cities, but without the chrome embellishments. The namings were held as ceremonies in the respective cities. A less appealing moniker is Schienenwolf ("railroad plough") as the three axle bogie construction stresses heavily the tracks.

Originally designed for heavy services on the Gotthard route, as many Swiss locomotives were, the Ae 6/6 was one of the classic Gotthard locomotives.

All locomotives were originally painted in the SBB CFF FFS green livery, with the number, and either SBB CFF, or SBB FFS on each side, all raised numerals in chrome. Nowadays about half are painted red, and a proportion of the fleet have been repainted in SBB Cargo livery, with all raised chrome embellishments removed apart from the Swiss coat of arms on each end. These locomotives have been renumbered (as class 610) in line with the current Swiss numbering scheme

History
Before the advent of the Ae 6/6, trains on the Gotthard route were hauled mainly by Ae 4/6, Ae 4/7 and Be 6/8 ("crocodile"), which were underpowered by contemporary standards. This led to many trains needing bank engines on the Gotthard ramps, and adding them was a tedious, uneconomical and impractical procedure.

Demands on the Ae 6/6
SBB needed a more powerful locomotive. The specification, created in 1949, included that the locomotive to be developed must be able the pull a 600 tonne train over the 26‰ gradients of the Gotthard line at 75 km/h. The first prototype with the number 11401 was scheduled for delivery in 1952.

Experiences with the prototypes
Intense trial runs were made with the prototypes. They had bogies with fixed axles, which led to heavy rail and wheel flange abrasion. Despite some early technical issues, the SBB-CFF-FFS were convinced they were on the right path with the development of the Ae 6/6. After introducing side-elastic wheelsets and making the wheel flanges of the middle axles smaller, the series production started in 1954, resulting in the first series locomotives delivered in 1955.

Operations until the 1960s

Summary
In its heyday, the 1950s and 1960s, the Ae 6/6 was the Gotthard locomotive par excellence, both for passenger and freight traffic. They were also used on the route through the Simplon tunnel. They were used in turns to ensure regular servicing in the main maintenance facility at Bellinzona. In the late 1960s, the two prototypes were retired from service on the Gotthard line; gradually followed by the rest of the class, although occasional workings continue to this day. After the introduction of the Re 6/6 locomotives, most Ae6/6 were reallocated to services in the Swiss plateau. Since this time, they have been mostly used for freight trains, because they are too slow for the faster passenger services. An exception were those units hired by the BLS, which were sometimes used to haul relief and intercity trains over the Lötschberg route.

The prototypes
The locomotive 11401 was delivered in 1952, and put on test runs. 11402 was completed in 1953. They were tested in a two-day programme on the Gotthard route, where they run up to 900 km in one day. Temporarily, however, there were one or two of the six motors broken, which were replaced by ballast to keep the correct weight. The locomotives with broken motors where then used in services normally run by the less powerful Ae 4/7.

The series locomotives 11403-11520 were delivered from 1955 to 1966. They first replaced the Ae 4/7 and later the newer Ae 4/6. 

For about 20 years, practically all heavy freight and passenger trains on the Gotthard route were hauled by this locomotive.

Namings
Locomotive namings were a feature introduced to Switzerland with the Ae 6/6, a custom adopted from Britain. All Ae 6/6 were decorated with a coat of arms of cantons or communes. They were grand events at the time, and every canton was proud to get its "own" Ae 6/6. Locomotives 11426 to 11520 got coats of arms of communes.

The names for the Ae 6/6 are:

A new canton is born
When the new Canton of Jura (the 26th Swiss Canton) was created in 1979, following decades of separatist demands, a locomotive had to be found to carry the new Canton's name in keeping with the history of the Ae6/6 as 'Kantonsloks'. Instead of the logical 11426 (the next number after the rest of the Canton named locomotives), 11483, named after a Jura canton commune, was chosen to receive the name 'Jura'. Its previous name Porrentruy was transferred to Re4/4II 11239

1970s to 1990s

Summary
In the 1970s, the two prototypes 11401 and 11402 were further developed, but never reached the quality of the series locomotives. In 1971, the first 'challenge' to the dominance of the Ae 6/6 came in the form of the new Re 4/4III on the Gotthard line. The first real competition, however, was the Re 6/6 introduced in 1975, which was designed to be the successor of the Ae 6/6 and is nearly twice as powerful.

The former star of the Gotthard was thus displaced to 'lesser' services and has since mostly used in the Swiss plateau and Jura mountains.

Building blocks based construction
The series locomotives 11403-11520 were built in 'modular' style, with each separate section easily replaced. Some were involved in serious accidents, and could be fixed in short time thanks to this system.

Accident at Winterthur
On 12 April 1989, 11401 «Ticino» collided with an Re 4/4II at Winterthur. One third of the locomotive body was damaged, and the locomotive division of the main workshop Bellinzona wanted to scrap it. However, railfans stood up for the preservation of this very first Ae 6/6 locomotive, so it got a second chance. It was a most elaborate and expensive rebuild and took two years.

21st century

In 1999, all 120 locomotives were assigned to the SBB-CFF-FFS cargo division (SBB Cargo) following the internal reorganisation of the SBB-CFF-FFS. The Ae 6/6 is still a very reliable locomotive for freight traffic.

Because the Ae 6/6 have three-axle bogies, they are deemed "rail killers" because of the higher rail abrasion compared to engines with two-axle bogies. This was especially considered an issue for freight runs on the Chemin de fer du Jura route Porrentruy-Bonfol.

One of the biggest disadvantages of the Ae 6/6 is said to be the lack of multiple unit train control, which makes operating two engines together impractical. At one time, retrofitting this feature was proposed, but these plans were discarded due to the uncertain future of the locomotive.

It was also considered to equip some of the newer engines with cab signalling, to allow them to run on cab signalling only-routes. This was tentatively done on the 11512 «Horgen».

The remaining operational locomotives are still used for freight trains, but often they just stand about in larger shunting yards. After the coats of arms were found to be being stolen repeatedly (mostly as a souvenir, because it is generally assumed that the Ae 6/6 won't stay in service much longer and will eventually be scrapped), SBB Cargo ordered their removal in March 2005 and will presumably turn them over to SBB Historic.

On 2009-04-06 SBB-CFF-FFS announced that 65 of the class will be withdrawn from service because of the slump in demand caused by the recession. 53 will be stored pending an upturn whilst 12 will probably be scrapped or cannibalised.

Retirements from service
The first locomotive to be withdrawn was 11410 «Basel-Stadt», due to an accident in 2002. Since then more of the class have been withdrawn, among them the prototypes 11402 «Uri» and 11401 «Ticino». The rate of withdrawal accelerated in 2009. 

In 2002, 11401 «Ticino» was a guest on the open day at the Muttenz shunting yard, shortly after its 50th birthday. After a cable fire this locomotive was withdrawn on September 11, 2003.

Ae 6/6 for SBB Historic
The foundation SBB Historic already received the Ae 6/6 11402 «Uri», which will either remain operational as a historic locomotive or will become a static exhibit at Erstfeld railway station. There is 11403 «Schwyz, and 11421 «Graubünden, in the SBB Historic club, 11405 «Nidwalden, was used for spare parts by SBB Historic for 11407 «Aargau, 11416 «Glarus, is used as spare parts for the historic locomotive 11425 «Geneva, for SBB historic, and also 11411 «Zug, is preserved by SBB Historic as well kept in running order. 11401 «Ticino, the prototype still excites to this day and is on long-term to Club del San Gottardo Railway. However, since 20 May 2010, his locomotive is in the railway company Stuttgart in Horb am Necklar. Also 11413 «Schaffausen, is preserved at ora al Museo del transporti Lucerne,

Accident at Kaiseraugst
Ae 6/6 11437 «Stadt Basel» caused a stir when it derailed after passed a ground signal ("Zwergsignal") at red on a shunting track and derailed on a catch point. The engine ended up in a tilted position in the ballast beside the main track. 
However, it wasn't damaged heavily and returned to service soon after the incident.

Preservation
There are 14 SBB Ae 6/6's in preservation, they include 
Ae 6/6 11401 "Ticino" is preserved in the Eisenbahnmuseum in Horb, Germany. 
Ae 6/6 11402 "Uri" stationed in Erstfeld.
Ae 6/6 11404 "Luzern" is preserved at the Elektra Birseck Münchenstein. 
Ae 6/6 11406 "Obwalden". Only the cabin survives and is preserved by DESM.
Ae 6/6 11407 "Aargau" stationed in Brugg. It is on loan to the association Mikado. 
Ae 6/6 11411 "Zug" stationed in Erstfeld.
Ae 6/6 11413 "Schaffhausen" is on display at the Museum of Transport in Lucerne.
Ae 6/6 11416 "Glarus". It is no longer usable and used as a source of spare parts in Olten.
Ae 6/6 11418 "St. Gallen" is preserved at Galliker Transport AG Altishofen (it received the coat of arms of the canton of Lucerne instead of the original St. Gallen)
Ae 6/6 11419 "Appenzell Innerrhoden" privately owned in Biasca. 
Ae 610 420-2 (formerly Ae 6/6 11420 "Appenzell Ausserrhoden") is parked in a small museum in Sissach at Basel Landschaft.
Ae 6/6 11421 "Graubünden" preserved in Steinen. It is on loan to the association "Erhalt Lok Ae 6/6"
Ae 6/6 11424 "Neuchâtel" preserved by the Swiss Train association.
Ae 6/6 11425 "Geneva" preserved in Olten.
Ae 6/6 11456 "Olten" was scrapped in Kaiseraugst in late 2019 or early 2020. 
Ae 6/6 11481 "La Chaux-de-Fonds". Only the cab survives and serves as a driving simulator in the Railway Museum Kaeserberg in Granges-Paccot. It remains hidden in Ae 6/6 11409.
Ae 6/6 11501 "Renens". Preserved by the Swiss Train association.

So far only 16 remain preserved, but there are hopes to preserve more in future despite half of the other Ae 6/6s in regular service with SBB as of today.

The coats of arms of the cantons and the municipalities from the retired locomotives were handed over to SBB Historic. The donated collection includes most of the coats of arms from the Ae 6/6 locomotives and also including builder's plates, locomotive name plates and letter sets from certain locomotives.

See also
 List of stock used by Swiss Federal Railways

References 

 

Co′Co′ locomotives
15 kV AC locomotives
Ae 6 6
Electric locomotives of Switzerland
SLM locomotives
Brown, Boveri & Cie locomotives
Standard gauge locomotives of Switzerland
Railway locomotives introduced in 1952
Co′Co′ electric locomotives of Europe